Dahe Glacier is a glacier flowing northeast between Stone Ridge and Wise Ridge in the Saint Johns Range of Victoria Land. It terminates as a hanging glacier on a bluff 200 m above the head of the Debenham Glacier. Named by the Advisory Committee on Antarctic Names in 2005 after Qin Dahe, Director of the China Meteorological Administration; manager of the Great Wall Station for two years in the 1980s; co-author of studies on distribution, transport and range of chemicals recovered from surface snow and ice cores in traverses from Zhongshan Station to Dome Argus, 1996–2002.

References

Glaciers of Victoria Land